This article is based in large part on a translation of the article :fr:Hugues Ier du Maine from the French Wikipedia on 10 July 2012.
Hugh I was count of Maine (reigned 900–933). He succeeded his father as of Count of Maine .

Life
He was the son of Roger, Count of Maine, and Rothilde, daughter of Charles the Bald. He succeeded his father . By a marriage of his sister Judith  to Hugh the Great sometime before 917, Hugh became an ally to the Robertians ending a long period of hostility between them. Around 922, King Charles the Simple withdrew the benefit of the Abbey of Chelles from Rotilde, Hughʻs mother and Hugh the Greatʻs mother-in-law, to entrust it to a favorite of his, Hagano. The favoritism shown Hagano caused a great deal of resentment and led, in part, to a revolt against Charles the Simple that placed Robert I of France on the throne. Even after the death of his sister when Hugh the Great married a second time he remained an adherent of the Robertians.

Family
By his unnamed wife, very probably a Rorgonide, he had:
Hugh II, Count of Maine (d. bef. 991).

Notes

References

933 deaths
Counts of Maine